Morrisdale is a census-designated place located in Morris Township, Clearfield County, in the state of Pennsylvania. As of the 2020 census the population was 684.

Notable People - Levi Jones from the American EDM pop duo O.D.L (Our Dysfunctional Life). He was formerly a member of the American pop band The Tide.

Demographics

References
3. The Tide (band)

Census-designated places in Clearfield County, Pennsylvania
Census-designated places in Pennsylvania